is the fifth compilation album by Japanese entertainer Miho Nakayama. Released through King Records on January 20, 1993, the album compiles Nakayama's songs that were used as theme songs or image songs for TV dramas she starred in from 1985 to 1992. The popularity of the No. 1 single "Sekaijū no Dare Yori Kitto" (featuring Wands) helped boost the album's sales.

The album peaked at No. 2 on Oricon's albums chart. It sold over 435,000 copies and was certified Platinum by the RIAJ.

Track listing

Charts
Weekly charts

Year-end charts

Certification

References

External links
 
 
 

1993 compilation albums
Miho Nakayama compilation albums
Japanese-language compilation albums
King Records (Japan) compilation albums